Arthur Patrick Cannon (May 22, 1904 – January 23, 1966) was a four-term United States Representative from Florida, serving from 1939 to 1947.

Early life and education
Cannon was born in Powder Springs, Georgia and later moved to Laurens County, South Carolina where he attended the public schools. On the post-secondary level, he attended Wofford College, Stetson University, and graduated from the University of Miami School of Law in 1931. He was admitted to the bar in 1931, and commenced the practice of law in Miami, Florida.

Congress
Cannon was elected as a Democrat to Florida's 4th District in the United States House of Representatives for the Seventy-sixth Congress, and to the three succeeding sessions of the United States Congress (January 3, 1939 – January 3, 1947). He was an unsuccessful candidate for renomination in 1946, losing the election to future U.S. Senator George Smathers.

Later career and death
After leaving Congress, Cannon resumed the practice of law and was elected circuit judge of Dade County, Florida in 1952. He was reelected in 1954 and in 1960 to six-year terms.

Cannon was a resident of Miami, Florida until his death in Miami on January 23, 1966. Cannon was interred in Woodlawn Park Cemetery (now Caballero Rivero Woodlawn North Park Cemetery and Mausoleum), Miami, Florida.

References

External links 

 GovTrack.US
 

1904 births
1966 deaths
University of Miami School of Law alumni
Democratic Party members of the United States House of Representatives from Florida
People from Powder Springs, Georgia
Wofford College alumni
Stetson University alumni
20th-century American politicians